NFL+ (formerly NFL Game Pass) is an over-the-top subscription service operated by the National Football League (NFL) in the United States. The service offers live-streaming of the radio broadcasts of all NFL games, streaming of the television broadcasts of in-market games on mobile devices, streaming of out-of-market preseason games, and library content from NFL Films and NFL Network. The service's premium tier offers on-demand replays of NFL games, including alternate "All-22" and "Coaches Film" presentations.

The service is an amalgamation of several streaming services previously offered by the NFL, including NFL Audio Pass (formerly NFL Field Pass)–which launched in 2003 in partnership with RealNetworks to stream radio broadcasts, and NFL Game Rewind. Audio Pass and Game Rewind were merged to form NFL Game Pass in 2015. In turn, Game Pass was merged with the NFL's in-market mobile streaming rights (formerly held by Verizon Media) in 2022 to form NFL+.

History
In January 2003, the NFL announced a partnership with RealNetworks to serve as its streaming media partner, offering exclusive multimedia features during the playoffs via the company's RealOne SuperPass subscription service. Chris Russo, the league's senior vice president of new media and publishing, stated that the playoff content was a pilot that could lead to "a subscription program that includes elements such as video, audio, enhanced analysis and fantasy football" in the future. 

Ahead of the 2003 NFL season, the NFL launched two subscription services in partnership with RealNetworks, including NFL.com Fantasy Extra–which offered expanded analysis and video content oriented towards fantasy football players, and NFL Field Pass–which would carry the radio broadcasts for all NFL games, video features on NFL.com (including game highlights), the weekly program NFL Insider Radio, and coverage of team press conferences. To enforce exclusive regional rights and encourage use of the service, the NFL prohibited local radio affiliates from including game broadcasts in their internet radio streams.

In 2006, the NFL launched NFL Game Pass as its streaming service for international markets in cooperation with Yahoo! Sports; it would later launch NFL Game Rewind in 2008 for on-demand streaming of completed NFL games, including "Coaches Film" and "All-22" feeds. NFL Field Pass was renamed NFL Audio Pass prior to the 2010 season. That year, the NFL started live streaming preseason games online.

In 2015, the NFL merged NFL Game Rewind with NFL Audio Pass, forming a single service under the NFL Game Pass branding in the United States.

The NFL previously maintained an exclusive mobile streaming rights package with Verizon Communications, as part of its official wireless carrier sponsorship of the league; streaming of in-market and nationally-televised games on smartphones was exclusive to the Verizon-operated "NFL Mobile" service, which was only available as a paid add-on for Verizon Wireless subscribers. This exclusivity deal prohibited the NFL's television partners from streaming their telecasts on smartphones, thus network-run TV Everywhere streams could only be viewed on PCs and tablet computers. Under a five-year extension of the agreement beginning in the 2017–18 NFL playoffs and 2018 NFL season, Verizon waived this exclusivity to take advantage of its acquisition of Yahoo!; mobile in-market streams, as well as other NFL-related digital content, was made available via Yahoo! Sports, while NFL broadcasters were authorized to stream games via their platforms on all device classes.

In May 2022, it was reported that with the expiration of the NFL's agreement with Verizon (which had divested AOL and Yahoo! to Apollo Global Management in 2021), its teams had approved a proposal to paywall mobile in-market streams behind a new "NFL Plus" service. NFL+ was officially announced on July 25, 2022, succeeding Game Pass in the United States. The service will be offered in two tiers, with the basic service offering in-market streaming on mobile devices, streaming of radio broadcasts and most preseason games, as well as library content from NFL Films and NFL Network. The premium tier of NFL+ will add game replays.

NFL Game Pass International
Outside the United States, NFL+ is branded as NFL Game Pass International. The service offers 230+ games live and on demand, as well as live access to NFL RedZone and NFL Network. Beginning in 2023, the service is offered through DAZN, as either a standalone subscription or an add-on to an existing DAZN package.

See also 
 NFL Sunday Ticket
 DAZN

References

External links
 

Subscription video on demand services
National Football League mass media